Antonio Augusto Persico was an Italian long-distance runner. He competed in the marathon at the 1920 Summer Olympics but did not finish the race. His personal best in marathon race is 2:44:36 established in 1920. His athletic club was SS Mazzini Roma.

See also
 Italy at the 1920 Summer Olympics

References

External links
 

Year of birth missing
Year of death missing
Athletes (track and field) at the 1920 Summer Olympics
Italian male long-distance runners
Italian male marathon runners
Olympic athletes of Italy